Saša Stamenković (Serbian Cyrillic: Саша Стаменковић; born 5 January 1985) is a Serbian professional footballer who plays as a goalkeeper.

Club career
After leaving Neftçi in 2015, Stamenković went on trial with Russian side Krylia Sovetov, before signing for PAE Kerkyra.

On 31 March 2016, Stamenković signed for Kazakhstan Premier League side FC Okzhetpes.

On 26 June 2018, he signed with Sabah. On 26 May 2021, he extended his contract with Sabah to the end of the summer 2022 but left the club by mutual consent on 16 December 2021.

International career
He was called up to represent Serbia at the 2008 Summer Olympics in Beijing.

Career statistics

Awards

Club
Red Star Belgrade
 Serbian Cup: 2009–10

Neftçi
 Azerbaijan Premier League: 2011–12, 2012–13
 Azerbaijan Cup: 2012–13

Individual
 Serbian SuperLiga Team of the Year: 2009–10 (with Red Star)

References

External links
 Profile at Red Star official website
 Stamenković Saša Profile at FK Napredak Kruševac official site
 Profile at Srbijafudbal
 www.sportskaberza.com
 Saša Stamenković Stats at Utakmica.rs

1985 births
Living people
Sportspeople from Leskovac
Serbian footballers
Serbian expatriate footballers
Footballers at the 2008 Summer Olympics
Olympic footballers of Serbia
Association football goalkeepers
FK Radnički 1923 players
FK Napredak Kruševac players
Red Star Belgrade footballers
PAE Kerkyra players
FC Okzhetpes players
Sabah FC (Azerbaijan) players
Neftçi PFK players
Serbian SuperLiga players
Azerbaijan Premier League players
Kazakhstan Premier League players
Expatriate footballers in Azerbaijan
Expatriate footballers in Greece
Expatriate footballers in Kazakhstan